State Highway 31 (SH 31)  runs from U.S. 84 northeast of Waco via Corsicana, Athens, Tyler, Kilgore to U.S. 80 in Longview.

History
 SH 31 was a route proposed on October 9, 1917 to run from Waco northeast via Corsicana and Athens to Tyler, which remains the western portion of its current route to this day. On November 27, 1922, the route had been extended northeast to Gladewater, replacing part of SH 15 so that SH 15 had only one route west of Gladewater. On October 26, 1932, SH 31 Spur was designated through Malakoff. On September 26, 1939, the section from Tyler to Gladewater was reassigned to U.S. 271 (which it had been cosigned with earlier), with SH 31 now being extended east to Kilgore over former SH 176. SH 31 Spur was renumbered as Spur 63. On June 30, 1971, SH 31 was extended north to I-20 concurrent with US 259. When U.S. 259 was rerouted on July 25, 1985, SH 31 was extended northeast into Longview. In 2013, a new route was designated around Corsicana for a proposed bypass. Construction on the bypass began in 2016 and opened to traffic in 2021.

Route description

SH 31 begins at an interchange with US 84 northeast of Waco. The highway travels through rural areas of McLennan County, passing just north of Axtell. SH 31 intersects FM 939 then enters Hill County. In Hill County, the highway bypasses the towns of Mount Calm and Hubbard. Entering Navarro County, SH 31 runs through Dawson and has an overlap with FM 709 through the town then intersects FM 667 near Navarro Mills Lake. The highway then bypasses Corsicana, passing near or through the towns of Oak Valley, Retreat, and Mildred and intersects I-45 and US 287 in southeast Corsicana. SH 31 passes just north of the Richland-Chambers Reservoir before entering the town of Powell. The highway then travels through the town of Kerens before crossing the Trinity River into Henderson County. 

In Henderson County, the route becomes less rural. SH 31 passes just south of the Cedar Creek Reservoir while serving the towns of Trinidad and Malakoff. The highway then enters Athens, bypassing the town on Loop 7; along with Loop 7, SH 31 also has overlaps with US 175 and SH 19 around Athens. SH 31 then leaves the loop in northeast Athens near an intersection with FM 317 then travels through the towns of Murchison and Brownsboro. The highway crosses over the northwestern segment of Lake Palestine, travels through Chandler, then crosses the Neches River into Smith County. SH 31 intersects Loop 49 Toll and travels through suburban areas of Smith County before entering Tyler. The highway travels through Tyler along Front Street, passing just south of the downtown area and serves as the southern terminus of US 271 near The Health Science Center at UT Tyler, then leaves the city just after intersecting Loop 323 for a second time. Leaving Tyler, the highway's route becomes more rural again, traveling through wooded areas before entering Kilgore. In Kilgore, SH 31 has a brief overlap with US 259 that lasts until I-20. The highway has an interchange with Loop 281 then enters Longview. SH 31 turns in a more northward direction at South Street then ends at US 80 near downtown, with the road continuing north as Spur 63.

Major intersections

Business routes
SH 31 has four business routes.

Hubbard business loop

Business State Highway 31-C (Bus. SH 31-C) is a business loop that runs through Hubbard. The highway is known locally as North 4th Street.

Junction list

Corsicana business loop

Business State Highway 31-D (Bus. SH 31-D) is a business loop that runs through Corsicana. The route was designated in 2013. 

The highway is known locally as 7th Avenue or Dr. Martin Luther King, Jr. Boulevard. Just east of FM 2555 (45th Street) the road passes by Navarro College.

Junction list

Athens business loop

Business State Highway 31-H (Bus. SH 31-H) is a business loop that runs through Athens. The route was designated in 2004 when SH 31 was re-routed along Loop 7. 

The highway is known locally as Corsicana Street west of downtown and east of downtown it is known as Tyler Street and briefly runs along Prairieville Street for a block near the Henderson County Courthouse. SH 31 Bus. H has an overlap with US 175 Bus. in the western part of town.

Junction list

Mount Calm business loop

Business State Highway 31-K (Bus. SH 31-K) is a business loop that runs near Mount Calm. The road was designated on July 30, 2015 when SH 31 was rerouted to the west.

Both ends of the highway have no access to westbound SH 31 with traffic only be able to access eastbound SH 31. The only highway SH 31 Bus. K intersects between its termini is FM 339.

Junction list

See also

 List of state highways in Texas
 List of highways numbered 31

References

External links

031
Transportation in Gregg County, Texas
Transportation in Smith County, Texas
Transportation in Henderson County, Texas
Transportation in Navarro County, Texas
Transportation in Hill County, Texas
Transportation in McLennan County, Texas